Pierre-Maurice Bogaert (born in Brussels 1934) is a Belgian Benedictine of the Monastery of Maredsous, professor emeritus of Old Testament at the Catholic University of Louvain and co-director of the Revue Bénédictine.

Life

Education 

Bogaert studied theology and exegesis in Leuven, Strasbourg (state doctorate), Jerusalem and Rome. From 1969 he holds his ThD from the University of Strasbourg.

Teaching 

In 1991 Bogaert has become professor of Old Testament at the Université catholique de Louvain.

Field of work 

His research focuses on the ancient transmission of the Bible. Since 1964 he has published in the Bulletin de la Bible latine dans la Revue bénédictine (which he has directed since 2000). After 1992 Bogaert was chair of the Revue théologique de Louvain.  He has taken an interest in the text of the Bible de Lobbes (1084) in several articles. He is a contributor to the New Cambridge History of the Bible.

Award 

In 2005 he received the Burkitt Medal from the British Academy.

Bibliography

Articles

References

Sources 

Living people
1934 births
Academic staff of the Université catholique de Louvain